The Gateway Cup is a four-day criterium cycling race held in St. Louis, Missouri over Labor Day weekend.  There are five races each day based on ability, ranging from novices (Category 5 cyclists) to professionals (Category 1 cyclists).  There are over $25,000 in prize money awarded over the four-day race.

The race is on an approximately one-mile closed course within four distinct St. Louis neighborhoods. The race duration varies from 30 minutes to 75 minutes.

References

Cycle races in the United States
Recurring sporting events established in 1985
1985 establishments in Missouri
Men's road bicycle races